is a public prefectural junior college in Kagoshima, Kagoshima, Japan, established in 1950. The predecessor of the school was founded in 1922.

External links
 Official website 

Educational institutions established in 1922
Public universities in Japan
Universities and colleges in Kagoshima Prefecture
Japanese junior colleges
1922 establishments in Japan